The following is List of Universities and Colleges in Sichuan.

Public
Sichuan University (四川大学, Chengdu) - Double First Class University Plan
University of Electronic Science and Technology of China (电子科技大学, Chengdu) - Double First Class University Plan 
Southwest Jiaotong University (西南交通大学, Chengdu) - Double First Class University Plan
Southwestern University of Finance and Economics (西南财经大学, Chengdu) - Double First Class University Plan
Chengdu University of Technology (成都理工大学, Chengdu) - Double First Class University Plan
Sichuan Agricultural University (四川农业大学, Yaan) - Double First Class University Plan
Southwest Petroleum University (西南石油大学, Chengdu, Nanchong) - Double First Class University Plan
Chengdu University of Traditional Chinese Medicine (成都中医药大学, Chengdu) - Double First Class University Plan
Southwest University for Nationalities(西南民族大学, Chengdu)
Civil Aviation Flight University of China(中国民用航空飞行学院, Guanghan)
Sichuan Normal University (四川师范大学, Chengdu)
Chengdu University of Information Technology (成都信息工程大学, Chengdu)
Xihua University (西华大学, Chengdu)
Southwest Medical University (西南医科大学，Luzhou)
China West Normal University (西华师范大学, Nanchong)
Chengdu Normal University (成都师范学院, Chengdu)
Chengdu Industrial Institute (成都工业学院, Chengdu)
North Sichuan Medical College (川北医学院, Nanchong)
Aba Teachers University (阿坝师范学院, Ngawa Tibetan and Qiang Autonomous Prefecture)

Private
Chengdu Neusoft University (成都东软学院, Chengdu)
Geely University of China (吉利学院, Chengdu)
Sichuan University of Media and Communications (四川传媒学院, Chengdu)
Chengdu College of Arts and Sciences (成都文理学院, Chengdu)
Sichuan University of Culture and Arts (四川文化艺术学院, Mianyang)
Sichuan Institute of Industrial Science and technology (四川工业科技学院, Deyang)
Sichuan Film and Television University (四川电影电视学院, Chengdu)
Sichuan Technology and Business University (四川工商学院, Chengdu)
Chengdu Jincheng College (成都锦城学院, Chengdu)
Gingko Hospitality Management College (成都银杏酒店管理学院, Chengdu)

Independent institution
Sichuan University Jinjiang College (四川大学锦江学院, Meishan)
Chengdu College of University of Electronic Science and Technology of China (电子科技大学成都学院, Chengdu)
Tianfu College of Southwestern University of Finance and Economics (西南财经大学天府学院, Mianyang, Chengdu)
The Engineering & Technical College of Chengdu University of Technology (成都理工大学工程技术学院, Leshan)
Chengdu Institute Sichuan International Studies University (四川外国语大学成都学院, Chengdu)
City College, Southwest University of Science and Technology (西南科技大学城市学院, Mianyang)
Southwest Jiaotong University Hope College (西南交通大学希望学院, Nanchong, Chengdu)

References
List of Chinese Higher Education Institutions — Ministry of Education
List of Chinese universities, including official links
Sichuan Institutions Admitting International Students

 
Sichuan